Geir Langslet (born 9 October 1956 in Horten, Norway) is a Norwegian jazz pianist and band leader raised in Fredrikstad.

Career 
Langslet is a graduate of the Berklee College of Music. He was a member of the band LAVA for 20 years, and participated in numerous recordings and tours in the 1980s and 1990s. He has been orchestra conductor for NRK for several years, including for Melodi Grand Prix five times, from 1995 to 1999. He had conducted the Norwegian entries in the Eurovision Song Contest three times in 1995, 1997 and 1998. He has also been band leader for "The show must go on", which is a Queen tribute concert show with Åge Sten Nilsen. Now he is a band leader for the show «Tina-Simply the Best»,which is a tribute to Tina Turner.

Honors 
1984: Spellemannprisen in the class POP, with LAVA.

Discography 

1980: Lava (Polydor Records) 
1981: Cruisin (Polydor Records)
1982: Prime Time (Polydor Records) 
1984: Fire (Polydor Records)
1985: Prime Cuts (Polydor Records), Compilation
1990: Rhythm of Love (Polydor Records)
1996: The Very Best of Lava (Polydor Records), Compilation
2003: Polarity (Polydor Records)
2005: Alibi (Polydor Records)
2009: Symphonic Journey (Polydor Records), live album

With Jahn Teigen
1979: En Dags Pause (RCA Victor)

With Alex
1979: Hello I Love You! (Mercury Records)
1980: Daddy's Child (Polydor Records)
1981: Alex' Beste (Polydor Records), Compilation

With Trond Granlund
1981: Pleasant Surprise (CBS Records)

With Stein Ove Berg
1981: Bergtatt (NorDics)

With Anita Skorgan
1981: Pastell (Snowflake Skandinavisk Artist Produksjon )

With Prima Vera
1981: Ha Ha He He Ho! (De Gærne Har'e Godt) (RCA Victor)
1983: Her Kommer Olavs Menn (RCA Victor)

With Olav Stedje
1982: Tredje Stedje (Hot Line)
2006: Livstegn (Tylden & Co)
2011: Ikkje Utan Deg (Tylden & Co)

With Kjell Fjalsett
1982: Forandring (New Song)

With Ketil Bjørnstad
1983: Aniara (New Song), Rock opera

With Terje Bakke & Test 1
1983: Høyt Spill (Test Records)

Within Silhouette
1984: Silhouette (RCA Victor)

Within Doxa
1984: Så Langt... (Klango Records)
1986: Noe Som Spirer (Scan Music)

With Lill Lindfors
1985: Människors Makt (Slagerfabrikken)

With Sissel Kyrkjebø
1986: Sissel (Noahs Ark)
1986: Glade Jul (Noahs Ark)
1994: Se Ilden Lyse (Forenede Fonogramprodusenter)

With Pål Thowsen
1986: Call Me Stranger (Polydor Records)

With Rita Eriksen
1988: Back From Wonderland (Desperado Records)

With Egil Eldøen
1988: Here We Go Again (Sonet Records)

With Elisabeth Andreassen
1996: Bettans Jul (Polydor Records)

References

External links 
Geir Langslet on Myspace

1956 births
Living people
20th-century Norwegian male musicians
21st-century Norwegian male musicians
20th-century Norwegian pianists
21st-century Norwegian pianists
Musicians from Horten
Jazz-pop pianists
Male jazz composers
Norwegian jazz composers
Norwegian jazz pianists
Norwegian male pianists
Lava (band) members
Berklee College of Music alumni
Eurovision Song Contest conductors
Spellemannprisen winners